Kalateh-ye Shah Mohammad may refer to:

 Kalateh-ye Shah Mohammad, Kashmar
 Kalateh-ye Shah Mohammad, Quchan